In music, hemiola (also hemiolia) is the ratio 3:2. The equivalent Latin term is sesquialtera. In rhythm, hemiola refers to three beats of equal value in the time normally occupied by two beats. In pitch, hemiola refers to the interval of a perfect fifth.

Etymology
The word hemiola comes from the Greek adjective ἡμιόλιος, hemiolios, meaning "containing one and a half," "half as much again," "in the ratio of one and a half to one (3:2), as in musical sounds." The words "hemiola" and "sesquialtera" both signify the ratio 3:2, and in music were first used to describe relations of pitch. Dividing the string of a monochord in this ratio produces the interval of a perfect fifth. Beginning in the 15th century, both words were also used to describe rhythmic relationships, specifically the substitution (usually through the use of coloration—red notes in place of black ones, or black in place of "white", hollow noteheads) of three imperfect notes (divided into two parts) for two perfect ones (divided into three parts) in tempus perfectum or in prolatio maior.

Rhythm
In rhythm, hemiola refers to three beats of equal value in the time normally occupied by two beats.

Vertical hemiola: sesquialtera
The Oxford Dictionary of Music illustrates hemiola with a superimposition of three notes in the time of two and vice versa.

 

One textbook states that, although the word "hemiola" is commonly used for both simultaneous and successive durational values, describing a simultaneous combination of three against two is less accurate than for successive values and the "preferred term for a vertical two against three … is sesquialtera." The New Harvard Dictionary of Music states that in some contexts, a sesquialtera is equivalent to a hemiola. Grove's Dictionary, on the other hand, has maintained from the first edition of 1880 down to the most recent edition of 2001 that the Greek and Latin terms are equivalent and interchangeable, both in the realms of pitch and rhythm, although David Hiley, E. Thomas Stanford, and Paul R. Laird hold that, though similar in effect, hemiola properly applies to a momentary occurrence of three duple values in place of two triple ones, whereas sesquialtera represents a proportional metric change between successive sections.

Sub-Saharan African music
A repeating vertical hemiola is known as polyrhythm, or more specifically, cross-rhythm. The most basic rhythmic cell of sub-Saharan Africa is the 3:2 cross-rhythm. Novotney observes: "The 3:2 relationship (and [its] permutations) is the foundation of most typical polyrhythmic textures found in West African musics." Agawu states: "[The] resultant [3:2] rhythm holds the key to understanding ... there is no independence here, because 2 and 3 belong to a single Gestalt."

In the following example, a Ghanaian gyil plays a hemiola as the basis of an ostinato melody. The left hand (lower notes) sounds the two main beats, while the right hand (upper notes) sounds the three cross-beats.

European music
In compound time ( or ). Where a regular pattern of two beats to a measure is established at the start of a phrase. This changes to a pattern of three beats at the end of the phrase.

The minuet from J. S. Bach's keyboard Partita No. 5 in G major articulates groups of 2 times 3 quavers that are really in  time, despite the  metre stated in the initial time-signature. The latter time is restored only at the cadences (bars 4 and 11–12):

Later in the same piece, Bach creates a conflict between the two metres ( against ):

Hemiola is found in many Renaissance pieces in triple rhythm. One composer who exploited this characteristic was the 16th-century French composer Claude Le Jeune, a leading exponent of musique mesurée à l'antique. One of his best-known chansons is "Revoici venir du printemps", where the alternation of compound-duple and simple-triple metres with a common counting unit for the beat subdivisions can be clearly heard:

The hemiola was commonly used in baroque music, particularly in dances, such as the courante and minuet. Other composers who have used the device extensively include Corelli, Handel, Weber and Beethoven. A spectacular example from Beethoven comes in the scherzo from his String Quartet No. 6.

Later in the nineteenth century, Tchaikovsky frequently used hemiolas in his waltzes, as did Richard Strauss in the waltzes from Der Rosenkavalier, and the third movement of Robert Schumann's Piano Concerto is noted for the ambiguity of its rhythm. John Daverio says that the movement's "fanciful hemiolas... serve to legitimize the dance-like material as a vehicle for symphonic elaboration."

Johannes Brahms was particularly famous for exploiting the hemiola's potential for large-scale thematic development. Writing about the rhythm and meter of Brahms's Symphony No. 3, Frisch says "Perhaps in no other first movement by Brahms does the development of these elements play so critical a role. Metrical ambiguity arises in the very first appearance of the motto [opening theme]."

Horizontal hemiola
Peter Manuel, in the context of an analysis of the flamenco soleá song form, refers to the following figure as a horizontal hemiola or "sesquialtera" (which mistranslates as: "six that alters").

This figure is a common African bell pattern, used by the Hausa people of Nigeria, in Haitian Vodou drumming, Cuban palo, and many other drumming systems. The horizontal hemiola suggests metric modulation ( changing to ). This interpretational switch has been exploited, for example, by Leonard Bernstein, in the song "America" from West Side Story, as can be heard in the prominent motif (suggesting a duple beat scheme, followed by a triple beat scheme):

Pitch

The perfect fifth
Hemiola can be used to describe the ratio of the lengths of two strings as three-to-two (3:2), that together sound a perfect fifth. The early Pythagoreans, such as Hippasus and Philolaus, used this term in a music-theoretic context to mean a perfect fifth.

The justly tuned pitch ratio of a perfect fifth means that the upper note makes three vibrations in the same amount of time that the lower note makes two. In the cent system of pitch measurement, the 3:2 ratio corresponds to approximately 702 cents, or 2% of a semitone wider than seven semitones. The just perfect fifth can be heard when a violin is tuned: if adjacent strings are adjusted to the exact ratio of 3:2, the result is a smooth and consonant sound, and the violin sounds in tune. Just perfect fifths are the basis of Pythagorean tuning, and are employed together with other just intervals in just intonation. The 3:2 just perfect fifth arises in the justly tuned C major scale between C and G.

Other intervals
Later Greek authors such as Aristoxenus and Ptolemy use the word to describe smaller intervals as well, such as the hemiolic chromatic pyknon, which is one-and-a-half times the size of the semitone comprising the enharmonic pyknon.

See also
Syncopation

References

Sources

Further reading 
Brandel, Rose (1959). The African Hemiola Style, Ethnomusicology, 3(3):106–117, correction, 4(1):iv.
Károlyi, Ottó (1998). Traditional African & Oriental Music, Penguin Books. .

Ratios
Musical techniques
Musical terminology
Rhythm and meter